The Rue André Barsacq is a road located in Montmartre. Formerly known as the Rue Berthe, its name refers to the playwright André Barsacq.

Access 
Metro stations include Abbesses and Anvers.

Features
 Galerie Chappe (at #4)
 Galerie Paul Frèches (at #12)

External links 
 www.paris.fr

André Barsacq